Boston University (BU) is a private research university in Boston, Massachusetts. BU was founded in 1839 by a group of Boston Methodists with its original campus in Newbury, Vermont, before being chartered in Boston in 1869. BU is a member of the Boston Consortium for Higher Education and the Association of American Universities. It is classified among "R1: Doctoral Universities – Very High Research Activity". The Boston University Terriers compete in the NCAA Division I.

The university is nonsectarian, though it retains its historical affiliation with the United Methodist Church. The university has more than 4,000 faculty members and nearly 34,000 students and is one of Boston's largest employers. It offers bachelor's degrees, master's degrees, doctorates, and medical, dental, business, and law degrees through 17 schools and colleges on three urban campuses. The main campus is situated along the Charles River in Boston's Fenway-Kenmore and Allston neighborhoods, while the Boston University Medical Campus is located in Boston's South End neighborhood. The Fenway campus houses the Wheelock College of Education and Human Development, formerly Wheelock College, which merged with BU in 2018.

BU athletic teams compete in the Patriot League and Hockey East conferences, and their mascot is Rhett the Boston Terrier. Boston University is well known for men's hockey, in which it has won five national championships, most recently in 2009.

Among its alumni and current or past faculty, the university counts 8 Nobel Laureates, 23 Pulitzer Prize winners, 10 Rhodes Scholars, 6 Marshall Scholars, 9 Academy Award winners, and several Emmy and Tony Award winners. BU also has MacArthur, Fulbright, and Truman Scholars, as well as American Academy of Arts and Sciences and National Academy of Sciences members, among its past and present graduates and faculty. In 1876, BU professor Alexander Graham Bell invented the telephone in a BU lab.

History

Predecessor institutions and University Charter

Boston University traces its roots to the establishment of the Newbury Biblical Institute in Newbury, Vermont, in 1839, and was chartered with the name "Boston University" by the Massachusetts Legislature in 1869. The university organized formal centennial observances both in 1939 and 1969. One or the other, or both dates may appear on various official seals used by different schools of the university.

On April 24–25, 1839, a group of Methodist ministers and laymen at the Old Bromfield Street Church in Boston elected to establish a Methodist theological school. Set up in Newbury, Vermont, the school was named the "Newbury Biblical Institute".

In 1847, the Congregational Society in Concord, New Hampshire, invited the institute to relocate to Concord and offered a disused Congregational church building with a capacity of 1200 people. Other citizens of Concord covered the remodeling costs. One stipulation of the invitation was that the Institute remain in Concord for at least 20 years. The charter issued by New Hampshire designated the school the "Methodist General Biblical Institute", but it was commonly called the "Concord Biblical Institute".

With the agreed twenty years coming to a close, the trustees of the Concord Biblical Institute purchased  on Aspinwall Hill in Brookline, Massachusetts, as a possible relocation site. The institute moved in 1867 to 23 Pinkney Street in the Beacon Hill neighborhood of Boston, and received a Massachusetts Charter as the "Boston Theological Seminary".

In 1869, three trustees of the Boston Theological Institute obtained from the Massachusetts Legislature a charter for a university by the name of "Boston University". These trustees were successful Boston businessmen and Methodist laymen, with a history of involvement in educational enterprises, and they became the founders of Boston University. They were Isaac Rich (1801–1872), Lee Claflin (1791–1871), and Jacob Sleeper (1802–1889), for whom Boston University's three West Campus dormitories were later named. Lee Claflin's son, William, was then Governor of Massachusetts and signed the University Charter on May 26, 1869, after it was passed by the Legislature.

As reported by Kathleen Kilgore in her book Transformations, A History of Boston University (see Further reading), the founders directed the inclusion in the Charter of the following provision, unusual for its time:

No instructor in said University shall ever be required by the Trustees to profess any particular religious opinions as a test of office, and no student shall be refused admission ... on account of the religious opinions he may entertain; provided, nonetheless, that this section shall not apply to the theological department of said University.

Every department of the new university was also open to all on an equal footing regardless of sex, race, or (with the exception of the School of Theology) religion.

Early years (1870–1900)

The Boston Theological Institute was absorbed into Boston University in 1871 as the BU School of Theology.

On January 13, 1872, Isaac Rich died, leaving the vast bulk of his estate to a trust that would go to Boston University after ten years of growth while the university was organized. Most of this bequest consisted of real estate throughout the core of the city of Boston, which was appraised at more than $1.5 million. Kilgore describes this as the largest single donation to an American college or university as of that time. By December, however, the Great Boston Fire of 1872 had destroyed all but one of the buildings Rich had left to the university, and the insurance companies with which they had been insured were bankrupt. The value of his estate, when turned over to the university in 1882, was half what it had been in 1872.

As a result, the university was unable to build its contemplated campus on Aspinwall Hill, and the land was sold piecemeal as development sites. Street names in the area, including Claflin Road, Claflin Path, and University Road, are the only remaining evidence of university ownership in this area. Following the fire, Boston University established its new facilities in buildings scattered throughout Beacon Hill, and later expanded into the Boylston Street and Copley Square area, before building its Charles River Campus in the 1930s.

After receiving a year's salary advance to allow him to pursue his research in 1875, Alexander Graham Bell, then a professor at the school, invented the telephone in a Boston University laboratory. In 1876, Borden Parker Bowne was appointed professor of philosophy. Bowne, an important figure in the history of American religious thought, was an American Christian philosopher and theologian in the Methodist tradition. He is known for his contributions to personalism, a philosophical branch of liberal theology. The movement he led is often referred to as Boston Personalism.

The university continued its tradition of openness in this period. In 1877, Boston University became the first American university to award a PhD to a woman, when classics scholar Helen Magill White earned hers with a thesis on "The Greek Drama". Then in 1878 Anna Oliver became the first woman to receive a degree in theology in the United States, but the Methodist Church would not ordain her. Lelia J. Robinson, who graduated from the university's law school in 1881, became the first woman admitted to the bar in Massachusetts. Solomon Carter Fuller, who graduated from the university's School of Medicine in 1897, became the first black psychiatrist in the United States and would make significant contributions to the study of Alzheimer's disease.

20th century and establishment of the Charles River campus

Seeking to unify a geographically scattered school and enable it to participate in the development of the city, school president Lemuel Murlin arranged that the school buy the present campus along the Charles River. Plans for a riverside quadrangle with a Gothic Revival administrative tower modeled on the "Old Boston Stump" in Boston, England were scaled back in the late 1920s when the State Metropolitan District Commission used eminent domain to seize riverfront land for Storrow Drive. Murlin was never able to build the new campus, but his successor, Daniel L. Marsh, led a series of fundraising campaigns (interrupted by both the Great Depression and World War II) that helped Marsh to achieve his dream and to gradually fill in the university's new campus. By spring 1936, the student body included 10,384 men and women.

In 1951, Harold C. Case became the school's fifth president and under his direction the character of the campus changed significantly, as he sought to change the school into a national research university. The first large dorms, Claflin, Rich and Sleeper Halls in West Campus were built, and in 1965 construction began on 700 Commonwealth Avenue, later named Warren Towers, designed to house 1800 students. Between 1961 and 1966, the BU Law Tower, the George Sherman Union, and the Mugar Memorial Library were constructed in the Brutalist style, a departure from the school's traditional architecture. The College of Engineering and College of Communication were housed in a former stable building and auto-show room, respectively. Besides his efforts to expand the university into a rival for Greater Boston's more prestigious academic institutions, such as Harvard University and the Massachusetts Institute of Technology (both in Cambridge across the Charles River from the BU campus), Case involved himself in the start of the student/societal upheavals that came to characterize the 1960s.

When a mini-squabble over editorial policy at college radio WBUR-FM – whose offices were under a tall radio antenna mast in front of the School of Public Relations and Communications (later College of Communications) – started growing in the spring of 1964, Case persuaded university trustees that the university should take over the widely-heard radio station (now a major outlet for National Public Radio and still a BU-owned broadcast facility). The trustees approved the firing of student managers and clamped down on programming and editorial policy, which had been led by Jim Thistle, later a major force in Boston's broadcast news milieu. The on-campus political dispute between Case's conservative administration and the suddenly active and mostly liberal student body led to other disputes over BU student print publications, such as the B.U. News and the Scarlet, a fraternity association newspaper.

The Presidency of John Silber also saw much expansion of the campus and programs. In the late 1970s, the Lahey Clinic vacated its building at 605 Commonwealth Avenue and moved to Burlington, Massachusetts. The vacated building was purchased by BU to house the School of Education. After arriving from the University of Texas in 1971, Silber set out to remake the university into a global center for research by recruiting star faculty. Two of his faculty "stars", Elie Wiesel and Derek Walcott, won Nobel Prizes shortly after Silber recruited them. Two others, Saul Bellow and Sheldon Glashow won Nobel Prizes before Silber recruited them.

In addition to recruiting new scholars, Silber expanded the physical campus, constructing the Photonics Center for the study of light, a new building for the School of Management, and the Life Science and Engineering Building for interdisciplinary research, among other projects. Campus expansion continued in the 2000s with the construction of new dormitories and the Agganis Arena.

History of student and faculty activism on campus 
To protest the poor condition of Boston University's African-American curriculum, on April 25, 1968 (three weeks after the assassination of Martin Luther King Jr.), African-American students conducted a sit-in and locked BU President Dr. Arland F. Christ-Janer out of his office for 12 hours. Umoja, BU's Black Student Union, put forward ten demands to Dr. Christ-Janer and got nine of them approved that included the creation of a Martin Luther King Chair of Social Ethics, expansion of African-American library resources and tutoring services, opening an "Afro-American coordinating center," admission and selection of more Black students and faculty. No disciplinary action was taken against the students who only opened the chains after their demands were met. "There was no surprise, or feeling of victory on the students' parts," said Dr. Christ-Janer in response to the sit-in. "They had confidence in their demands, and I had a confidence in them. The university, black and white alike, was the winner."

The late twentieth century saw a culmination in student activism at Boston University during the presidency of John R. Silber. In 1972, student protests rose against the university administration's endorsement of Marine Corps recruitment on campus which faced significant opposition from the Student Democratic Society. On March 27, 1972, 50 police officers in "riot gear" defused a demonstration of 150 protesters at 195 Bay State Road, the BU Placement Office, where Marine recruiters were holding student interviews. A few protesters were arrested while some sustained minor injuries, including a student and two officers. Contrary to student claims of a peaceful protest, Silber said, "Civilization doesn't abdicate in face of barbarism. Those students or nonstudents who deliberately seek violent confrontation and refuse all efforts at peaceful resolution of issues must expect society to use its police power in its own defense." In response to Silber's decision of a forceful police intervention, the Faculty State conducted a vote on Silber's resignation which could not pass due to a "vote of 140-25 with 32 abstentions." As a result of this failed motion, Peter P. Gabriel resigned his position as the dean of Boston University's School of Management in protest of Silber's presidency and his "counterproductive" leadership. Silber's support of military recruitment on campus, which he pushed to make the university eligible for Federal grants, caused other demonstrations. On December 5, 1972, fifteen BU Student Government officers started a three-day hunger strike at Marsh Chapel demanding Silber "to file a lawsuit against the Federal government challenging the constitutionality of the Herbert Amendment."

On March 16, 1978, about 900 Boston University students gathered at the George Sherman Union to protest against the $400 rise in tuition and $150 rise in housing charges declared by the trustees on March 7. The protest interrupted a board of trustees conference. While John Silber and Arthur G.B. Metcalf, the chairman of the board of trustees, were negotiating with student government representatives to discuss the matter further on a separate occasion, the protesters marched into the building from two entrances, effectively trapping 40 trustees and 10 university administrators in the building for over thirty minutes. Twenty officers from the Boston University Police Department had to disperse the crowd from the stairwells. The protest resulted in the arrest of 19 year old Joshua Grossman, while another student and two BUPD officers were taken to hospitals.

On April 5, 1979, several hundred faculty members, as well as clerical workers and librarians, went on strike. The faculty members were seeking a labor contract while the clerical workers and librarians were seeking union recognition. The strike ended by mid-April under terms favorable to the employees.

On November 27, 1979, the committee to Defend Iranian Students- composed of Iranian students, Youths Against Foreign Fascism and the Revolutionary Communist Party, held a demonstration at the George Sherman Union against the deposed Shah of Iran and the deportation of Iranian students from the US. "To the Iranian people, that man (the shah) is Adolf Hitler," students protested. "The Shah Must Face the Wrath of the People." This was met with chants of "God Bless America" from the opposing group. Twenty policemen broke up the confronting parties though no arrests were made.

21st century 

Robert A. Brown's presidency, which started in 2005, has sought to further the consolidation of campus infrastructure that was commenced by earlier administrations. During his tenure, Brown has strengthened the core missions of undergraduate, graduate, and professional education, interdisciplinary work, and research and scholarship across all 17 schools and colleges.

In 2012, the university was invited to join the Association of American Universities, comprising 66 leading research universities in the United States and Canada. BU, one of four universities at the time invited to join the group since 2000, became the 62nd member. In the Boston area, Harvard, MIT, Tufts, and Brandeis are also members.

That same year, a $1 billion fundraising campaign was launched, its first comprehensive campaign, emphasizing financial aid, faculty support, research, and facility improvements. In 2016, the campaign goal was reached. The Board of Trustees voted to raise the goal to $1.5 billion and extend through 2019. The campaign has funded 74 new faculty positions, including 49 named full professorships and 25 Career Development Professorships. The campaign concluded in September 2019, raising a total of $1.85 billion over seven years.

In February 2015 the faculty adopted an open-access policy to make its scholarship publicly accessible online.

In 2016, Times Higher Education (THE) named Boston University to a list of 53 "international powerhouse" institutions, schools that have the best chance of being grouped alongside—or ahead of—THE most elite global "old stars", a group that includes the University of Oxford, Stanford, Harvard, Yale, MIT, and Princeton.

The Charles River and Medical Campuses have undergone physical transformations since 2006, from new buildings and playing fields to dormitory renovations. The campus has seen the addition of a 26-floor student residence at 33 Harry Agganis Way, nicknamed StuVi2, the New Balance Playing Field, the Yawkey Center for Student Services, the Alan and Sherry Leventhal Center, the Law tower and Redstone annex, the Engineering Product Innovation Center (EPIC), the Rajen Kilachand Center for Integrated Life Sciences & Engineering, and the Joan and Edgar Booth Theatre, which opened in fall 2017. The construction of the Rajen Kilachand Center for Integrated Life Sciences & Engineering was funded by part of BU's largest ever gift, a $115 million donation from Rajen Kilachand. The Dahod Family Alumni Center in the renovated BU Castle began in May 2017 and was completed in fall 2018. Development of the university's existing housing stock has included significant renovations to BU's oldest dorm, Myles Standish Hall and Annex, and to Kilachand Hall, formerly known as Shelton Hall, and a brand new student residence on the Medical Campus.

In 2019, Boston University expanded its financial aid program so that it would "meet the full need for all domestic students who qualify for financial aid," starting in fall 2020.

In September 2022, Robert A. Brown announced he will step down at the end of the 2022–2023 academic year. Brown began his presidency in September 2005, and his contract was set to run through 2025.

Response to the COVID-19 pandemic
The university closed down due to the COVID-19 pandemic and shifted to online learning for the remainder of the semester on March 11, 2020. For the fall 2020 semester, BU offered a hybrid system that allows for students to decide whether to take a remote class or participate in-person. Larger classes would be broken down into smaller groups that rotate between online and in-person sessions. The school started administering its own COVID-19 testing for faculty, staff, and students on July 27, 2020. The new BU Clinical Testing Laboratory has accelerated testing that can give results to students, staff, and faculty by the next day. The lab uses eight robots to process up to 6,000 tests per day. A contact tracing team is part of the process to contain infections on campus. BU also started a new website "Back2BU" to provide students with the latest information on reopening.

The results of the tests are published on BU's public COVID-19 Testing Data Dashboard.

BU's National Emerging Infectious Diseases Laboratories (NEIDL) has been working with live coronavirus samples since March 2020, and—at the time—was the only New England lab to have live samples.

In August 2020, BU filed a service mark application with the United States Patent and Trademark Office to secure the phrase "F*ck It Won't Cut It" for a student-led COVID-19 safety program on campus. The slogan is meant to promote "safe and smart actions and behaviors for college and university students in a COVID-19 environment", according to the application.

In July 2021, BU announced faculty and staff will be required to be vaccinated against COVID-19 for the fall 2022 semester. This comes after a vaccine requirement for all students, which was announced in April.

COVID-19 research and gain-of-function controversy 
In October 2022, Boston University's National Emerging Infectious Diseases Laboratories conducted research in a Biosafety Level 3 lab that modified the original strain of the virus that causes COVID-19 with the spike proteins of the Omicron variant. This resulted in a virus that was more lethal to lab mice than the Omicron variant itself, but less lethal than the original strain. Some medical authorities criticized the research as dangerous "gain of function" research, but others argued that it did not technically count as gain of function research because the modified virus happened not to be quite as lethal as the original strain. Marc Lipsitch of Harvard, however, argued "these are unquestionably gain-of-function experiments. As many have noted, this is a very broad term encompassing many harmless and some potentially dangerous experiments. GOF is a scientific technique, not an epithet." While the BU researchers gained internal research and Boston government approvals for the research, they failed to notify the US Government's National Institute of Allergy and Infectious Diseases that was a funder of the lab.

Campus

Boston campuses and facilities

The university's main Charles River Campus follows Commonwealth Avenue and the Green Line, beginning near Kenmore Square and continuing for over a mile and a half to its end near the border of Boston's Allston neighborhood. The Boston University Bridge over the Charles River into Cambridge represents the dividing line between Main Campus, where most schools and classroom buildings are concentrated, and West Campus, home to several athletic facilities and playing fields, the large West Campus dorm, and the new John Hancock Student Village complex.

The main campus buildings of BU are separated from the Charles River Esplanade parkland and the Paul Dudley White Bike Path along the banks of the nearby Charles River, by heavily trafficked Storrow Drive, a high-speed limited-access major roadway connecting downtown Boston to its western suburbs. The separation occurred in the late 1920s, when the Commonwealth of Massachusetts seized land by eminent domain for the construction of the new roadway along the riverbank. A narrow strip of grassy lawn between BU academic buildings lining Commonwealth Avenue and the torrent of traffic on Storrow Drive has been humorously dubbed "BU Beach", because it is a favorite hangout for sunbathing in good weather. The lounging students are protected from traffic incursions by a raised earthen berm, which also muffles the traffic noise to a dull roar. To protect pedestrians from vehicular collisions, Storrow Drive is enclosed by fencing, with pedestrian bridges allowing safe crossings at Silber Way and at Marsh Chapel. An additional crossing is possible at the BU Bridge, which also allows street traffic to cross from the Boston side to the Cambridge side of the Charles River.

As a result of its continual expansion, the Charles River campus contains an array of architecturally diverse buildings. The College of Arts and Sciences, Marsh Chapel, and the School of Theology buildings are the university's most recognizable, and were built in the late-1930s and 1940s in collegiate gothic style. A sizable amount of the campus is traditional Boston brownstone, especially at Bay State Road and South Campus, where BU has acquired almost every townhouse those areas offer. The buildings are primarily dormitories, but many also serve as various institutes as well as department offices.

From the 1960s–1980s many contemporary buildings were constructed, including the Mugar Library, BU Law School, and Warren Towers, all of which were built in the brutalist style of architecture. The Metcalf Science Center for Science and Engineering, constructed in 1983, might more accurately be described as Structural Expressionism. Morse Auditorium, adjacent, stands in stark architectural contrast, as it was originally constructed as a Jewish synagogue. The most recent architectural additions to BU's campus are the Photonics Center, Life Science and Engineering Building, The Student Village (which includes the FitRec Center and Agganis Arena), and the Questrom School of Business. All these buildings were built in brick, a few with a substantial amount of brownstone. Boston University converted the old Nickelodeon Cinemas complex into College of Engineering labs and offices. In 2016, the university sold the building that housed the Huntington Theatre Company and constructed the Joan & Edgar Booth Theatre and College of Fine Arts Production Center to consolidate the theater program on campus.

BU has earned several historic preservation awards with recent extensive building renovation projects, such as the School of Law tower, the Alan & Sherry Leventhal Center, Myles Standish Hall, and the Dahod Family Alumni Center (formerly The Castle). Construction of the brick and glass Yawkey Center for Student Services was designed to follow the requirements of the Bay State Road historic district. Use of glass and steel for new construction on Commonwealth Avenue includes the Rajen Kilachand Center for Integrated Life Sciences & Engineering, which opened in 2017, and the 19-story Center for Computing & Data Sciences, which opened in 2022.

The ceremonial opening on December 8th, 2022 was covered by publications including Bloomberg, The Boston Globe, and CBS News which praised the building for being the largest carbon-neutral building in Boston and noted its unusual design. A ribbon cutting ceremony was performed by Boston Mayor Michelle Wu, President Robert A. Brown, the associate provost for computing and data sciences Azer Bestavros, dean of Arts & Sciences Stan Sclaroff, BU Board of Trustees chair Ahmass Fakahany, BU provost Jean Morrison, and Boston city councilor Kenzie Bok.

In 2018, following negotiations in the preceding year, Boston University purchased the former Wheelock College, which is now referred to as the Boston University Fenway Campus (although it is actually located in the adjacent neighborhood of Longwood).

, BU has sold or leased to real estate developers several building sites it owned in Kenmore Square next to its campus. Large multistory buildings are being constructed there, which will transform the long-time appearance of the busy traffic hub.

In September 2021, BU completed a $115 million project to renovate and expand the Henry M. School of Dental Medicine. The project expanded clinical spaces, added a simulation learning center, and improved collaborative spaces for students.

Student housing

Boston University's housing system is the nation's 10th largest among four-year colleges. BU was originally a commuter school, but the university now guarantees the option of on-campus housing for four years for all undergraduate students. Currently, 76 percent of the undergraduate population lives on campus. Boston University requires that all students living in dormitories be enrolled in a year-long meal plan with several combinations of meals and dining points which can be used as cash in on-campus facilities.

Housing at BU is an unusually diverse melange, ranging from individual 19th-century brownstone townhouses and apartment buildings acquired by the school to large-scale high-rises built in the 1960s and 2000s.

The large dormitories include the 1,800-student Warren Towers, the largest on campus, as well as West Campus and The Towers. The smaller dormitory and apartment style housing are mainly located in two parts of campus: Bay State Road and the South Campus residential area. Bay State Road is a tree-lined street that runs parallel to Commonwealth Avenue and is home to the majority of BU's townhouses, often called "brownstones". South Campus is a student residential area south of Commonwealth Avenue and separated from the main campus by the Massachusetts Turnpike. Some of the larger buildings in that area have been converted into dormitories, while the rest of the South Campus buildings are apartments.

Boston University's newest residence and principal apartment-style housing area is officially called 33 Harry Agganis Way, "StuVi2" unofficially, and is part of The John Hancock Student Village project. The north-facing, 26-story building is apartment style while the south-facing, 19-story building is in an 8-bedroom dormitory-style suite pattern. In total, the building houses 960 residents.

Aside from these main residential areas, smaller residential dormitories are scattered along Commonwealth Avenue.

Boston University also provides specialty houses or specialty floors to students who have particular interests.

All large dormitories have 24/7 security and require all students to swipe and validate their school identification before entering.

Kilachand Hall, formerly Shelton Hall, is rumored to be haunted by the ghost of playwright Eugene O'Neill. O'Neill lived in what was originally room 401 (now 419) while the building was a residential hotel. He died in a hospital on November 27, 1953, and his ghost is rumored to haunt both the room and the floor. The fourth floor is now a specialty floor called the Writers' Corridor.

John Hancock Student Village

The Student Village is a large new residential and recreational complex covering  between Buick Street and Nickerson Field, ground formerly occupied by a National Guard Armory, which had been used by the university for indoor track and field and as a storage facility before its demolition and the start of construction. The dormitory of apartment suites at 10 Buick Street (often abbreviated to "StuVi" by students) opened to juniors and seniors in the fall of 2000. In 2002, John Hancock Insurance announced its sponsorship of the multimillion-dollar project.

The Agganis Arena, named after Harry Agganis, was opened to concerts and hockey games in January 2005. The Agganis Arena is capable of housing 6,224 spectators for Terrier hockey games, replacing the smaller Walter Brown Arena. It can also be used for concerts and shows. In March 2005, the final element of phase II of the Student Village complex, the Fitness and Recreation (FitRec) Center, was opened, drawing large crowds from the student body. Construction on the rest of phase II, which included 19- and 26-story residential towers was finished in fall 2009.

Other facilities

The Mugar Memorial Library is the central academic library for the Charles River Campus. It also houses the Howard Gotlieb Archival Research Center, formerly called the Twentieth Century Archive, where documents belonging to thousands of eminent figures in literature, journalism, diplomacy, the arts, and other fields are housed.

The George Sherman Union (GSU), located next to Mugar Memorial Library, provides students with a food court featuring many fast-food chains, including Panda Express, Basho, Starbucks, and Pinkberry. The GSU also provides lounge areas for students to relax or study. The basement of the George Sherman Union is home to the BU Central lounge, which hosts concerts and other activities and events.

 "The Castle" located on the West end of Bay State Road is one of the older buildings on campus. The building was commissioned by William Lindsay for his own use in 1905, long before his daughter's honeymoon on the ill-fated Lusitania. In 1939, the university acquired the property by agreement with the city to repay all back taxes owed; these funds were raised through donations from, among others, Dr. William Chenery, a University Trustee. It served as the residence of the university president until 1967, when President Christ-Janer found it too large for his needs as a residence and turned it to other uses. It is now a conference space. Underneath the Castle is the BU Pub, the only BU-operated drinking establishment on campus.

The Florence and Chafetz Hillel House on Bay State Road is the Hillel House for the university. With four floors and a basement, the facility includes lounges, study rooms and a kosher dining hall, open during the academic year (including Passover) to students and walk-ins from the community. The first floor also includes the Granby St. Cafe as well as TVs and ping-pong, pool and foosball tables. The Hillel serves as a focal point for BU's large and active Jewish community. It hosts approximately 30 student groups, including social, cultural, and religious groups, and BU Students for Israel (BUSI), Holocaust Education, and the Center for Jewish Learning and Experience. It hosts a plethora of programs and speakers as well as Shabbat services and meals.

Cultural life
The university is located at the junction of Fenway-Kenmore, Allston, and Brookline. In the Fenway-Kenmore area are the Museum of Fine Arts, the Isabella Stewart Gardner Museum, and the nightlife of Landsdowne Street as well as Fenway Park, home of the Boston Red Sox. Allston has been Boston's largest bohemian neighborhood since the 1960s. Nicknamed "Allston Rock City", the neighborhood is home to many artists and musicians, as well as a variety of cafés, and many of Boston's small music halls.

Beyond the southern border of the campus in Brookline, Harvard Avenue offers independent and foreign films at Coolidge Corner Theatre, and author readings at the Brookline Booksmith. Other nearby cultural institutions include Symphony Hall, Jordan Hall, the main branch of the Boston Public Library in Copley Square, the art and commerce of fashionable Newbury Street, and across the Charles River, the museums, shops, and galleries in Harvard Square and elsewhere in Cambridge.

BU is home to the Boston Playwrights' Theatre. BU was previously associated with the Huntington Theatre Company on Huntington Avenue, but put the BU Theatre property up for sale in 2016, casting a shadow over the future of the organization. BU replaced the old Huntington Theatre facilities with the new Joan and Edgar Booth Theatre, located next to the Fuller Building housing the College of Fine Arts.

BU hosts campus and non-campus musical performances in the Tsai Performance Center at 685 Commonwealth Avenue, and the CFA Concert Hall at 855 Commonwealth Avenue.

Visual art works by students and by visiting artists are displayed in rotating exhibitions in the university's three galleries: the BU Art Gallery (BUAG) at the Stone Gallery, the 808 Gallery, and the Sherman Gallery, located respectively at 855, 808, and 775 Commonwealth Avenue. In addition, BU had been associated with the Photographic Resource Center located at 832 Commonwealth Avenue, which mounts several exhibitions yearly, as well as special events for student and professional photographers. However, BU withdrew its support , and the Photographic Resource Center is now a resident partner with the College of Art and Design at Lesley University.

Guest and visitor policies
Prior to September 2007, Boston University had a restrictive visitor policy, which limited the ability of students from different dormitories to visit each other at night. This changed when a new policy approved by Brown took effect. The new policy allows for students living on campus to swipe into any on-campus dormitory between the hours of 7 am and 2 am using their Terrier cards. Student residents can also sign in guests with photo identification at any time, day or night. Overnight visitors of the opposite sex are no longer required to seek a same-sex "co-host". However, during reading period and the week before final exams, no guests are permitted in the halls overnight, and are expected to be out of the hall by 2 am.

Mass transit

Most of the buildings of the main campus are located on or near Commonwealth Avenue, served by the  subway stop on the Green Line and five surface stops on the Green Line B branch. Crowding on the busy B branch is very seasonal; during the summer, ridership falls by more than half, largely due to the reduced student population. MBTA bus route  parallels the B branch on Commonwealth Avenue;  on the MBTA Commuter Rail Framingham/Worcester Line is located near East Campus.

Bicycle traffic on Commonwealth Avenue is heavy, and advocacy groups have held public meetings with BU, the MBTA, and the City of Boston to improve safety and congestion along this travel corridor. The MBTA plans to consolidate and reduce the number of stops along Commonwealth Avenue to speed travel and to reduce construction costs to upgrade the remaining stations. Improvements planned include full handicapped accessibility at the new stations, fencing to encourage pedestrians to use protected crosswalks, traffic signal prioritization for transit vehicles, and improved esthetics. The Commonwealth Avenue Improvement Project is coordinated by the Massachusetts Highway Department, in cooperation with BU, the MBTA, the City of Boston, the Boston Water and Sewer Commission, and other organizations.

The Medical Campus is served by the #1 and CT1 crosstown buses which run along Massachusetts Avenue, as well as the No. 47 and CT3 crosstown buses which connect the Boston University Medical Center with the Longwood Medical Area. The Silver Line Washington Street Branch runs the entire length of the Medical Campus, one block north of most parts of the campus; it connects Boston University Medical Center with Tufts Medical Center station and downtown Boston. The nearest rapid transit subway station is the Massachusetts Avenue station on the Orange Line, located three blocks north of the Medical Center.

Sustainability
The university has a sustainability initiative and a sustainability office. Boston University's Strategic Plan for Campus Sustainability is also integrated into the university's overarching strategic plan in many areas including the Climate Action Plan Task Force, a faculty-led initiative developing the university's first Climate Action Plan.

The university bought a wind farm in South Dakota to meet its goal of carbon neutrality by 2040.

Other campuses

London Campus

Boston University's largest study abroad program is located in London, England. Boston University London Programmes offers a semester of study and work in London through their London Internship Program (LIP), as well as a number of other specialized programs. The LIP program combines a professional internship with coursework that examines a particular academic area in the context of Britain's history, culture, and society and its role in modern Europe. Courses in each academic area are taught exclusively to students enrolled in the Boston University program by a selected faculty body representing multiple cultural backgrounds. Upon successful completion of a semester, students earn 16 Boston University credits. BU London Programmes are headquartered in South Kensington, London. The campus consists of the main building at 43 Harrington Gardens, as well as three nearby residences to house students. This program is open to Boston University students, as well as students at other American colleges.

Los Angeles Campus
In Los Angeles, BU has an internship program for students to study and work in the heart of the film, television, advertising, public relations, and entertainment management and law industries. The program offers three tracks from which undergraduate and graduate students can choose: Advertising and Public Relations, Film and Television, and Entertainment Management. Graduated students have the opportunity to continue their education by enrolling in the Los Angeles Certificate Program, where students can choose either the Acting in Hollywood or the Writer in Hollywood track. Courses are taught by Boston University faculty and alumni who serve as mentors in and out of the classroom. Upon successful completion of a semester students will earn 16 Boston University credits. Students who successfully complete the Los Angeles Certificate Program will receive 8 Boston University credits and a certificate from Boston University College of Fine Arts or College of Communication.

Paris Campus
The Paris Center runs several programs, the largest of which is the Paris Internship Program dating from 1989. Students take language and elective courses with French faculty at the BU Paris Center, then are placed in internships with French businesses and organizations in the area. Students live with host families or in a dormitory for the extent of the semester. Boston University Paris also organizes exchange programs with the business school Paris Dauphine University and a yearlong program with the Institut d'études politiques de Paris (Sciences Po).

Washington, DC Campus
In Washington, D.C., BU has internship, journalism and management programs. Students study in the university's building on Massachusetts Avenue in Dupont Circle and take advantage of the city by interning at different locations. In 2011, the university completed construction of a new, multistory residence to house students in the program featuring touch-less entry cards for security and suites with communal kitchens, right next to the Woodley Park Metro station. The Multimedia and Journalism program allows students to act as Washington, D.C. correspondents for newspapers and television stations across the Northeast and New England while interning at major news outlets in the city, as well as at many PR internships in politics, government and public affairs. Internship opportunities are also offered in a wide variety of sectors for students enrolled in other BU Study Abroad Washington programs.

Sydney Campus
In Sydney, BU has internship, management, film festival, travel writing, engineering, and School of Education programs that vary based on semester. Around 150 students live in the university's building in Chippendale developed by Tony Owen Partners. The building uses "fissures to provide maximum solar access to bedrooms as well as natural ventilation throughout the building". The building opened in the beginning of 2011 and features underground classrooms, a lecture hall, office space, library, and a roof patio.

Other internship and study abroad opportunities are available through the Study Abroad office.

Academics

Colleges and schools

Boston University offers bachelor's degrees, master's degrees, and doctorates, and medical, dental, and law degrees through its 17 schools and colleges. The newest school at Boston University is the Frederick S. Pardee School of Global Studies (established 2014). Boston University Wheelock College of Education & Human Development was renamed in 2018 following the merger with Wheelock College. In 2019, BU created the Faculty of Computing & Data Sciences, which is an interdisciplinary academic unit that will train students in computing and enable them to combine data science with their chosen field. In 2022, BU's medical school was renamed the Aram V. Chobanian & Edward Avedisian School of Medicine (following a $100 million gift from Edward Avedisian).

Each school and college at the university has a three letter abbreviation, which is commonly used in place of their full school or college name. For example, the College of Arts & Sciences is commonly referred to as CAS, the College of Engineering is ENG, and the College of Fine Arts is CFA, etc.

The College of Fine Arts was formerly named the School of Fine Arts (SFA). The College of Arts & Sciences (CAS) was formerly named the College of Liberal Arts (CLA). The College of Communication was formerly named the School of Public Communication (SPC). The Questrom School of Business (Questrom) was formerly known as the School of Management (SMG), and the College of Business Administration (CBA) prior to that. The College of General Studies (CGS) was formerly named the College of Basic Studies (CBS).

The Mental Health Counseling and Behavioral Medicine (MHCBM) Program at Boston University School of Medicine offers a master's degree for students who wish to become licensed to practice as a mental health counselor. The program adheres to educational guidelines and standards of the American Counseling Association (ACA), American Mental Health Counselors Association (AMHCA), and the Council for Accreditation of Counseling and Related Educational Programs (CACREP), which is an independent agency recognized by the Council for Higher Education Accreditation. The MHCBM Program is the only counselor education program in the entire United States that is housed in a medical school for solely training students in clinical mental health counseling to treat clients and patients with a mental disorder via counseling and psychotherapy. Boston University is accredited by the New England Commission of Higher Education.

Admissions
Fall Freshman statistics

Based on currently enrolled student responses within the university student database 50.6% white, 14% Asian, 11.6% international students, 8.6% Hispanic, and 3.2% black. Fall 2015 international student enrollment at Boston University is 43% Chinese, 9% Indian, 5% Korean, 5% Saudi Arabian, 4% Canadian, 4% Taiwanese, 2% Turkish, and 1% from each of the following countries: Venezuela, Brazil, Mexico, Italy, France, Thailand, Spain, and Japan. The other 18% of international enrollment comes from 123 other countries. Among international students, 39% are pursuing undergraduate degrees, 37% are pursuing graduate degrees, and 23% are enrolled in other programs. BU also has the second highest number of Jews of any private school (after NYU) in the country with between 3,000 and 4,000, or roughly 15% identifying as Jewish.

The plurality of registrants were from Massachusetts (19%), followed by New York (16%), New Jersey (9%), California (8%), Connecticut (4%), Pennsylvania (4%), and Texas (2%).

Boston University's financial aid program, "affordableBU", meets 100% of the demonstrated need of domestic students.

Rankings

U.S. News & World Report ranks Boston University tied for 41st among national universities and tied for 57th among global universities for 2022. It also ranked BU 29th in "Best Value Schools", tied for 41st in "Most Innovative Schools", and tied for 45th in "Best Undergraduate Engineering Programs" at schools whose highest degree is a doctorate and 12th in Biomedical Engineering. U.S. News & World Report also ranks Boston University's online graduate information technology programs tied for 10th in the U.S., the online graduate criminal justice programs tied for 3rd, and the online graduate business programs (excluding MBAs) tied for 10th.

Boston University is ranked No. 40 nationally in the 2021 Wall Street Journal/Time Higher Education U.S. colleges and universities ranking.

QS World University Rankings ranked Boston University 93rd overall in the world in its 2019 rankings, with a 5-star rating.

Times Higher Education ranked Boston University 54th in the world for 2021.

Times Higher Education ranked Boston University 6th in the 2017 Global University Employability Rankings.

The Academic Ranking of World Universities ranks Boston University 36th in the United States, and 76th in the world, in its 2019 list.

Newsweek (International Edition), in its list of the Top 100 Global Universities, ranked Boston University the 35th in the United States, and 65th in the world.

The Chronicle of Higher Education places the Boston University School of Social Work as sixth in the nation for research productivity by faculty.

BU is one of 96 American universities receiving the highest research classification ("RU/VH") by the Carnegie Foundation.

Research 

In FY2016, the university reported in $368.9 million in sponsored research, comprising 1,896 awards to 722 faculty investigators. Funding sources included the National Science Foundation (NSF), the National Institutes of Health (NIH), the US Department of Defense, the European Commission of the European Union, the Susan G. Komen Foundation, and the federal Health Resources and Services Administration. The university's research enterprise encompasses dozens of fields, but its primary focus currently lies in seven areas: Data Science, Engineering Biology, Global Health, Infectious Diseases, Neuroscience, Photonics, and Urban Health.

In 2017, BU received a $20 million grant over five years from the NSF in order to establish an Engineering Research Center (ERC). The ERC's goal is to bioengineer functional heart tissue. The director of the center is David Bishop, a professor of physics and computer and electrical engineering.

As of FY2021, the university reported $526.6 million in sponsored research, and 56% of federal funding was from the National Institutes of Health.

In 2003, the National Institute of Allergy and Infectious Diseases awarded Boston University a grant to build one of two National Biocontainment Laboratories. The National Emerging Infectious Diseases Laboratories (NEIDL) was created to study emerging infectious diseases that pose a significant threat to public health. NEIDL has biosafety level 2, 3, and 4 (BSL-2, BSL-3, and BSL-4, respectively) labs that enable researchers to work safely with the pathogens. BSL-4 labs are the highest level of biosafety labs and work with diseases with a high risk of aerosol transmission.

The strategic plan also encouraged research collaborations with industry and government partners. In 2016, as part of a broadbased effort to solve the critical problem of antibiotic resistance, the US Department of Health & Human Services (HHS) selected the Boston University School of Law (LAW)—and Kevin Outterson, a BU professor of law—to lead a $350 million trans-Atlantic public-private partnership called CARB-X to foster the preclinical development of new antibiotics and antimicrobial rapid diagnostics and vaccines. CARB-X was allotted an additional $370 million in funding in May 2022. HHS will continue to support CARB-X with up to $300 million over 10 years, and global charity Wellcome will fund up to $70 million over three years.

In its effort to increase diversity and inclusion, Boston University appointed Ibram X. Kendi in July 2020 as a history professor and the director and founder of its newly established Center for Antiracist Research. The university also appointed alumna Andrea Taylor as its first senior diversity officer. Later in August, Twitter founder and then CEO Jack Dorsey donated $10 million to the Center, noting that the gift came with "no string attached." 

Ibram Kendi was named a 2021 MacArthur fellow and will receive a "genius grant" of $625,000 split over five years for his center's research.

Grade deflation 
The independently run student newspaper at Boston University, The Daily Free Press, as well as The New York Times, have published articles exploring the existence of grade deflation. The Times discovered that administrators have suggested to faculty members deflated ideal grade distributions. Although an article in the official publication BU Today asserted that "the GPAs of BU undergrads and the percentage of As and Bs have both risen over the last two decades", The New York Times has found BU grades have been rising more slowly with respect to many other schools.

In 2014, the average GPA of a BU undergraduate was 3.16, compared to the averages of 3.35 for Boston College (2007), 3.48 for Amherst College (2006), 3.52 for New York University (2015), and 3.65 for Harvard University (2015).

About 81 percent of all grades earned in either the A or B range (75% in the B range). The article went on to note that although the university attempted to curb grade inflation and inconsistency in the late 1990s, both the percentage of As and GPAs have been rising since. They attributed the grade inflation that has occurred not to teachers' grading policies, but to the increasing quality of each incoming class which leads to more top grades.

Journals and publications

Boston University is home to several academic journals and publications. The School of Law hosts six nationally recognized law journals: the Boston University Law Review, American Journal of Law and Medicine, Review of Banking & Financial Law, Boston University International Law Journal, Journal of Science and Technology Law, and Public Interest Law Journal. The School of Education houses the Journal of Education, which is the oldest continuously published journal in the field of education in the country. In the College of Arts and Sciences, Studies in Romanticism is housed at the Department of English and the Journal of Field Archeology is housed at the Department of Archeology. The Department of History is affiliated with The Historical Society, which publishes The Journal of the Historical Society and Historically Speaking.
The American Journal of Media Psychology and the Public Relations Journal are currently edited by professors at the College of Communication, which is also home to the New England Center for Investigative Reporting, which generates numerous publications yearly.

Special academic programs

General Education: the BU Hub
BU Hub, the university-wide undergraduate general education curriculum, requires course work in the core capacities of: philosophical, aesthetic, and historical interpretation; scientific and social inquiry; quantitative reasoning; diversity, civic engagement, and global citizenship; written, oral, and multimedia communication; and an intellectual toolkit that includes critical thinking, collaboration, and creativity.

Kilachand Honors College
The University Honors College matriculated its first class in 2010. In 2011, it was renamed Arvind and Chandan Nandlal Kilachand Honors College following a $25 million donation from Rajen Kilachand; the largest donation in the history of the university. The Kilachand Honors College is a university-wide community of faculty and students dedicated to preserving, renewing, and rethinking classic ideals of liberal education: love of learning, intellectual curiosity, self-discovery, empathy, clarity of thought and expression. It rests on three pillars: an integrated, four-year curriculum; an extensive series of co-curricular events that include site-visits to leading cultural institutions as well as talks and readings by leading figures in the arts, sciences, and professions; and, finally, a "living and learning" community that offers students the personal atmosphere of a small liberal arts college and fosters responsibility and citizenship.

Trustee Scholars Program 

Around 20 freshmen from every Boston University graduating class are part of the Trustee Scholars Program. These students are recipients of the Trustee Scholarship, known to be the most prestigious merit-based, full-tuition scholarship for undergraduates. Although not an academic program per se, students "become part of a unique campus community that offers many intellectual, cultural, and social opportunities", such as special lectures by distinguished professors and scholars. They also gather for events, such as plays and performances in the Boston area, movie screenings, and book discussions.

Boston University Academy

Boston University Academy is a private high school operated by Boston University. Founded in 1993, the school sits within the university's campus and students are offered the opportunity to take university courses.

Student life

Student publications
Independent from the university, The Daily Free Press (often referred to as The FreeP) is the campus student newspaper and the fourth largest daily newspaper in Boston. Since 1970, it has provided students with campus news, city and state news, sports coverage, editorials, arts and entertainment, and special feature stories. The Daily Free Press is published every regular instruction day of the university year and is available in BU dorms, classroom buildings, and commercial locations frequented by students.

The literary magazine Clarion has been printed since 1998. The first issue, titled "?", was published by the group Students for Literary Awareness with the sponsorship of the Department of English; subsequent issues were issued by the BU Literary Society, and most recently, by the BU BookLab. Burn Magazine is a younger literary magazine, affiliated with Clarion, but publishing the work of student authors only.

Boink was launched in February 2005 by a group of undergrads led by Alecia Oleyourryk, who was then a senior at the College of Communications. The magazine featured BU students posing nude, as well as articles on sexuality.

ROTC
The Reserve Officer Training Corps (ROTC) at BU traces its origins back to August 16, 1919, when the US War Department stood up the Students' Army Training Corps at Boston University, the predecessor to the current Army ROTC program. Today, BU is one of twenty five colleges and universities in the country to host all three ROTC programs – Army, Navy, and Air Force. Students wishing to be commissioned into the Marine Corps study as Navy Midshipmen.

Honor Societies
Alpha Phi Sigma - Nu Mu Chapter

Athletics

Boston University's NCAA Division I Terriers compete in men's basketball, cross country, golf, ice hockey, rowing, soccer, swimming, tennis, track, and lacrosse, and in women's basketball, dance, cross country, field hockey, golf, ice hockey, lacrosse, rowing, soccer, softball, swimming, tennis, and track. Boston University athletics teams compete in the Patriot League, Hockey East, and Colonial Athletic Association conferences, and their mascot is Rhett the Boston Terrier. , a majority of Boston University's teams compete in the Patriot League. On April 1, 2013, the university announced it would cut its wrestling program following the 2013–14 season.

The Boston University men's hockey team is the most successful on campus, and is a storied college hockey power, with five NCAA championships, most recently in 2009. The team was coached by hall-of-famer Jack Parker for 40 seasons, and is a major supplier of talent to the NHL, as well as to the 1980 USA Olympic gold medal-winning men's hockey team. The Terriers have won 31 Beanpot titles, more than any other team in the tournament, which includes Harvard University, Boston College, and Northeastern University. The BU Women's ice hockey team has won 2 beanpot titles, once in 1981 and once in 2019. Boston University also won a game in 2010 against Boston College at Fenway Park by a score of 3–2, played a week after the NHL Winter Classic.

BU has also won two national championships in women's rowing, in 1991 and 1992.

In 2020, the men's basketball team won the Patriot League Men's Basketball Championship for the first time, but the NCAA men's Division I basketball tournament was canceled due to coronavirus concerns.

Boston University recently constructed the new Agganis Arena, which opened on January 3, 2005, with a men's hockey game between the Terriers and the University of Minnesota Golden Gophers. The arena also hosts non-sporting events, such as concerts, ice shows, and other performances.

Boston University disbanded its football team in 1997. The university used the nearly $3 million from its football program to build the multimillion-dollar John Hancock Student Village and athletic complex. The university also increased funding to women's athletic programs. "By implementing the total plan, we can achieve a much more balanced set of sports programs for both men and women, which is consistent with the philosophy underlying Title IX", said former BU athletic director Gary Strickler.

Club sports
Boston University students also compete in athletics at the club level. Thirty-four club sports are recognized by the university: badminton; baseball; cricket; cycling; equestrian; fencing; figure skating; golf; gymnastics; inline, men's, and women's ice hockey; jiu-jitsu; kendo; kung fu; women's and men's rugby; sailing; Shotokan karate; ski racing; snowboarding; men's and women's soccer; squash; women's synchronized skating; synchronized swimming; table tennis; triathlon; women's and men's ultimate frisbee; men's and women's volleyball; and women's and men's water polo.

The BU Sailing Team is one of the most successful teams in college sailing. The team has won seven National Championships, most recently in 1999. They have also had three team members graduate as "College Sailor of the Year". Notable alumni of the team include Ken Read, skipper for PUMA Ocean Racing in the Volvo Ocean Race, and 2012 US Sailing Rolex Yachtsman of the Year nominee, John Mollicone.

The BU Figure Skating Team has won five Intercollegiate National Figure Skating Championships and has not finished outside of the top three since 2009.

The BU Men's Club Volleyball team won the NCVF 1AA National Championship in 2016.

The BU Roller Hockey Team advanced to the NCHRA Tournament in 2001, 2002, and 2003. The team advanced all the way to the Final Four in 2001.

Both Men's and Women's Intervarsity Table Tennis Teams have attended the National Collegiate Table Tennis Tournaments and ranked as high as the top 10 nationwide.

Notable alumni and academics

Over the course of its history, a number of people associated with Boston University have become notable in their fields. Affiliates of Boston University have won seven Nobel prizes. With over 342,000 alumni, Boston University graduates can be found around the world. American civil rights movement leader Martin Luther King Jr. earned his doctorate in systematic theology at BU in 1955. After gaining prominence by advocating nonviolent resistance to segregation, he won the 1964 Nobel Peace Prize. Howard Thurman, the Dean of Marsh Chapel, influenced King's embrace of nonviolence. Three other alumni hold special historical importance: Rebecca Lee Crumpler was the first African-American woman and Charles Eastman (first named Ohiyesa) the first American Indian to be certified as doctors, and Helen Magill White was the first woman in the US to earn a PhD.

Mathematics and sciences

Among the most famous of Boston University scientists is Alexander Graham Bell, an inventor of the telephone who conducted many of his experiments on the BU campus when he was professor of Vocal Physiology and Elocution. In Boston, Bell was "swept up" by the excitement engendered by the many scientists and inventors residing in the city. In 1875, the university gave Bell a year's salary advance to allow him to pursue his research. The following year, he invented the telephone in a Boston University laboratory. In the twenty-first century, the university has become a pioneering center for synthetic biology thanks to the work of James Collins. Collins and co-workers also discovered that sublethal levels of antibiotics activate mutagenesis by stimulating the production of reactive oxygen species, leading to multidrug resistance. This discovery has important implications for the widespread use and misuse of antibiotics.

Dr. Christopher Chen, an interdisciplinary researcher whose work involves engineering, medicine, and biology, joined BU in 2013. Chen directs the Biological Design Center at the Rajen Kilachand Center for Integrated Life Sciences & Engineering. His research focuses on tissue engineering and regenerative medicine.

Other notable Boston University scientists include Sheldon Glashow, winner of the 1979 Nobel Prize in Physics, Daniel Tsui, winner of the 1998 Nobel Prize in Physics, and Osamu Shimomura, winner of the 2008 Nobel Prize in Chemistry.

Humanities, music, and art
Numerous actors trained at Boston University, including Faye Dunaway, Alfre Woodard, Russell Hornsby, Jason Alexander, Ginnifer Goodwin, Marisa Tomei, Emily Deschanel, Marc Maron, Viola Léger, Julianne Moore, Uzo Aduba, Paul Michael Glaser, Michael Chiklis, Sarah Chase, and Geena Davis. Notable musicians include Taiwanese composer Wen-Pin Hope Lee, rapper Aesop Rock and Russian-American Violinist Yevgeny Kutik. Folk singer Joan Baez attended BU for several months before dropping out to concentrate on her musical career.

Law
David A Rose (judge), noted judge in Boston, Associate Justice 1972–1976, Recalled retired justice 1978–1985, who headed Rights Panel.

Literature

Two US Poets Laureate have taught at Boston University: Robert Lowell and Robert Pinsky. During John Silber's tenure as president, he recruited two Nobel Prize–winning literary figures to the university's faculty: Elie Wiesel, winner of the 1986 Nobel Peace Prize, and Saul Bellow, winner of the 1976 Nobel Prize in Literature. Another Nobel Prize winner in the English Department in the twentieth century was Derek Walcott, winner of the 1992 Nobel Prize in Literature. Alumni of the university have earned over thirty Pulitzer Prizes. Other writers associated with the university include Bob Zelnick, executive editor of the Frost-Nixon interviews, Lambda Literary Award winner Ellen Bass, historian Andrew Bacevich, Ha Jin, Pulitzer Prize winner Jhumpa Lahiri, and Isaac Asimov.

In 1986, literary critic Christopher Ricks, whom W. H. Auden called "exactly the kind of critic every poet dreams of finding", joined the university's faculty and founded the Editorial Institute with Geoffrey Hill. Controversial historian Howard Zinn taught in the political science department for many years. Journalist Thomas B. Edsall and playwright Eliza Wyatt graduated from Boston University. Paul Beatty, who earned bachelor's and master's degrees in psychology at BU, won the National Book Critics Circle Award and the Man Booker Prize for his novel The Sellout. He is the first writer from the United States honored with the Man Booker. The bestselling author Casey Sherman graduated from BU in 1992.

Politics

Boston University counts eleven current or former governors of US states, seven United States senators, and 33 members of the United States House of Representatives among its alumni. Notable Boston University alumni in American politics include former Defense Secretary William Cohen, former US Ambassador to China Gary Locke, former Senator Judd Gregg, former United States Senator Edward Brooke; the first popularly elected African-American senator, former Massachusetts Attorney General Martha Coakley, former Second Lady Tipper Gore, and the former First Vice President of the Federal Reserve Bank of Boston Earle O. Latham. Former President William Howard Taft lectured on Legal Ethics at the university's law school from 1918 to 1921. After leaving politics in 2014, former Boston mayor Thomas Menino was professor of the practice of political science at the university until his death later in the year. Alexandria Ocasio-Cortez, the youngest woman elected to the House of Representatives, graduated in 2011.

Television personality Bill O'Reilly studied journalism at the university in the 1970s and was a columnist for the student newspaper, The Daily Free Press. Describing his time at the university, he wrote, "Throughout that fall at BU, covering stories became a passion for me. I loved going places and seeing new things. I ran around Boston annoying the hell out of everyone, but bringing back good, crisp copy" and "what I learned at Boston University firmly set me on the course I continue to this day. Amidst the chaos of Commonwealth Avenue, I found an occupation that I enjoyed."

In international politics, Boston University alumni include Sherwin Gatchalian, a Philippine senator elected in 2016, and Daniyal Aziz, a Pakistani politician affiliated with the Pakistan Muslim League (N) who is currently a member of the National Assembly of Pakistan. Archbishop Makarios, the first President of Cyprus, studied at Boston University under a World Council of Churches scholarship. The founder of the Albanian Orthodox Church, Fan S. Noli, received a doctorate from Boston University. Moeed Yusuf, the current National Security Advisor (Pakistan) to the Prime Minister of Pakistan, received his master's and doctoral degrees from Boston University.

Hollywood 

In 2014, The Hollywood Reporter took note of the number of female BU graduates working in Hollywood. The university estimates that more than 5,000 alums, 54 percent of them women, work in entertainment. They include actresses Geena Davis, Julianne Moore, Uzo Aduba, Marisa Tomei, Alfre Woodard, Rosie O'Donnell, Ginnifer Goodwin, Yunjin Kim. Behind the scenes players include former CBS Entertainment Chair Nina Tassler, NBCUniversal Cable Entertainment Group' Bonnie Hammer, A&E Networks' Nancy Dubuc, Warner Horizon Television Brooke Karzen, V writer Corinne Brinkerhoff, DreamWorks Animation's Bonnie Arnold, and Red Hour Films' Debbie Liebling.

Popular culture
A number of Boston University graduates have reached fame in popular culture. These include radio personality Howard Stern, Bravo executive Andy Cohen, CBS producer Gordon Hyatt, celebrity chef Rocco DiSpirito, bestselling self-help author Mark Manson, reality show contestant and television host Rob Mariano, Kevin O'Connor presenter of This Old House, and cohost of Project Runway and fashion editor for Marie Claire Magazine Nina Garcia. American comedian Marc Maron and YouTube personality Jenna Marbles studied for a master's degree in education at the university. The "Craigslist killer" Philip Markoff studied medicine at the university. YouTube essayist Evan Puschak of The Nerdwriter and musician and YouTube personality Dan Avidan both went to Boston University.

Athletics 
1968 Olympic 400 m hurdles gold medalist David Hemery was a student at BU in the 1960s, and a coach in the 1970s and 1980s. John Thomas attended BU in the early 1960s and he won a silver medal in the Olympic High Jump. He was an assistant track coach at BU during the 1970s.

On October 29, 2020, Travis Roy, a philanthropist, motivational speaker, and former BU ice hockey player, died. In 1995, Roy collided with the boards and was paralyzed just 11 seconds into his first hockey game for Boston University, making him quadriplegic. In 1996, Roy founded the Travis Roy Foundation to fund research for and help other spinal cord injury survivors. In 2017, BU created the Travis M. Roy Professorship in Rehabilitation Sciences after receiving $2.5 million from anonymous donors.

In popular culture
Boston University is sometimes referenced in art or pop culture. Here below are some notable examples.
The Standells, a 1960s California rock and roll band mocked the curfew that applied to female students in that time in their 1966 song "Dirty Water", singing, "Frustrated women have to be in by twelve o'clock".
Parts of the 2008 film 21 were filmed at The Castle when Robert Luketic could not film at MIT. Other areas around the Boston University campus, including BU's School of Management, Mugar Library and FitRec also provided production locations for the film.
Ash, a character in Ubisoft's 2015 game Rainbow Six Siege, studied at Boston University.
In 1962, Timothy Leary performed his Marsh Chapel Experiment, also known as the "Good Friday Experiment", in the university's Marsh Chapel. The experiment investigated whether psilocybin (the active principle in psilocybin mushrooms) would act as a reliable entheogen in religiously predisposed subjects.

Gallery

See also 
Boston University Tanglewood Institute
Boston University Police Department
Einstein Papers Project
Framingham Heart Study

Notes

References

Further reading

External links

The Brink, Boston University research news

 
1869 establishments in Massachusetts
Educational institutions established in 1869
Fenway–Kenmore
Universities and colleges in Boston
Private universities and colleges in Massachusetts